Telmatoscopus is a genus of flies belonging to the family Psychodidae.

The genus has cosmopolitan distribution.

Species:
 Telmatoscopus aberrans Tonnoir, 1953 
 Telmatoscopus acrobeles Quate & Quate, 1967

References

Psychodidae